Asa Smith Bushnell may refer to:

Asa S. Bushnell (Governor) (1834–1904), 40th Governor of Ohio
Asa Smith Bushnell II, son of Asa S. Bushnell (Governor) and father of Asa Smith Bushnell III
Asa Smith Bushnell III (1900–1975), secretary of the United States Olympic Committee